Diseius is a genus of mites in the family Ascidae.

Species
 Diseius ulmi (Hirschmann, 1962)

Distribution
Diseius are found generally living in colonies on tree bark.

Description 
It has a completely divided dorsal shield without transverse lines extending across the surface.  There is a podonotal shield with thirteen pairs of setae, an opisthonotal shield with twelve pairs of setae, a small anal shield with only circumanal setae, and a paranal setae inserted closer to the posterior margin of the anus than to the anterior margin.

References

Ascidae